Neigong, also spelled nei kung, neigung, or nae gong, refers to any of a set of Chinese breathing, meditation, somatics practices, and spiritual practice disciplines associated with Daoism and especially the Chinese martial arts. Neigong practice is normally associated with the so-called "soft style", "internal" or neijia  Chinese martial arts, as opposed to the category known as waigong  or "external skill" which is historically associated with shaolinquan or the so-called "hard style", "external" or wàijiā  Chinese martial arts. Both have many different schools, disciplines and practices and historically there has been mutual influence between the two and distinguishing precisely between them differs from school to school. 

There is both martial and non-martial neigong. Well-known examples of martial neigong are the various breathing and focus trainings taught in some traditional Taijiquan, Baguazhang, Xingyiquan and Liuhebafa schools. An example of non-martial neigong is the discipline known as Daoyin.

Internal martial arts

The martial art school of neigong emphasises training the coordination of the individual's body with the breath, known as "the harmonisation of the inner and outer energy", creating a basis for a particular school's method of utilising power and technique. 

Neigong exercises that are part of the neijia tradition involve cultivating physical stillness and or conscious (deliberate) movement, designed to produce relaxation or releasing of muscular tension combined with special breathing techniques such as the "tortoise" or "reverse" methods. The fundamental purpose of this process is to develop a high level of coordination, concentration and technical skill that is known in the martial arts world as neijin. The ultimate purpose of this practice is for the individual to become at one with heaven or the Dao. As Zhuangzi stated, "Heaven, earth and I are born of one, and I am at one with all that exists".

Martial nei gung is about developing internal power. One way to possibly achieve this is to train particular exercises regularly where the breath is matched with movements of blood or to effect the movement of blood throughout the body. Through these exercises it can be possible to move the blood to a particular area during a particular movement to have a particular result. One of the benefits of martial nei gung exercises is the relaxation of blood vessels, nerves, muscles and sinews to help the body move more freely. With the body moving freely and an excess of blood moving to a particular area with little or no effort, the practitioner can possibly develop many benefits. These benefits may include:
 faster recovery from injury to the hands
 an ability to hit with more force
 an ability to move faster (speed is crucial in martial arts)
 the health benefits of being relaxed
 an increase in connection to your legs, spine, arms and head
 increased stamina
 increased athletic ability and health
 regulation of blood pressure
 actually experiencing the channels of the body as they truly are, which can possibly be different from the books
 developing an authentic dan tien that is consciously nourished and deliberately formed which is not defined in the books
 greater sensitivity for sparring and fighting

It is important to understand that anyone looking to learn nei gung sincerely, is more likely to learn it from a good teacher of internal martial arts like Hsing-Yi (one of the easiest and most powerful forms of martial cultivation). It is rare to learn authentic Daoist practices from a true master of the subject as quite a lot of the nei gung skills are an essential part of a complete system of martial arts. Nei gung is not a philosophy, but a technique and an art of inner cultivation. There are intellectual guidelines to the practice of nei gung, but it is "Inner Work" which means effort has to be put in to develop real, substantial and testable skills. This is not something that can be imagined or talked about, only from direct experience and hard effort can an understanding of nei gung develop.

Meditation
This type of practice is said to require concentration and internal reflection which results in a heightened self-awareness that increases over time with continued practice. Neigong practitioners report awareness of the mechanics of their blood circulation, peristalsis, muscular movement, skeletal alignment, balance, etc. 

What is said to be occurring as the result of continual practice is a type of internal alchemy, that is a refinement and transmutation of the "Three Treasures" or San Bao, in Chinese. The Three Treasures are known as Jing, Qi and Shen and can be loosely translated as Essence, Vitality and Spirit. 

According to Daoist doctrine the Three Treasures can be described as three types of energy available to humans. The Dao De Jing purported to be written by Lao zi states in chapter 42 that "The Dao gives birth to the One, the One gives birth to the Two (Taiji or Yin and Yang) and the Two gives birth to the Three (which some interpret to mean Jing , Qi  and Shen , or sometimes Heaven Tian , Earth Di  and Man Ren ) and Three gives birth to the Four direction's, North, South, East, and West and so on to the 10,000 Things (Wanwu ); which is all that exists between heaven and  earth.

Dao De Jing 道德經, chapter 42, 道生一，一生二，二生三， 三生萬物. Dao produces one, one produces two, two produces three, three produces 10 Thousand Things (which represents, everything). 萬物負陰而抱陽，沖氣以為和。All things carry the dark (yin) and embrace the light (yang), and make them harmonize with empty energy.(老子道德經， 吳怡著)The Book of Lao Tzu [The Tao Te Ching]by Yi Wu, 1989, Great Learning Publishing Company.

Laozi (老子) did not say what one, two, or three are. Take a look at chapter two of the Dao De Jing. This gives a hint at what one and two might be. "When all in the world know beauty as beauty, then ugliness has already arisen." 

Commentary: Dao 道, is unmanifested, therefore unknowable. But once a thing (one) comes into existence, then its opposite (two) automatically comes into existence. Three is the dynamic exchange between the two. To begin to understand the dynamic between two things, read the YiJing 易經. The book of changes also known as the I Ching deals with the dynamic exchange between any two things. 

Neigong training follows therefore the classical Daoist developmental stages and regards the first two stages as a preparation for the last and final stage:

Essence (Jing) → Qi → Spirit (Shen)

In popular culture
Wuxia and xianxia fiction often portray the training of neigong as giving practitioners superhuman powers. For example, one may use qi to attack opponents without physical contact, fly with qinggong, or harden the body to resist weapon attacks. These can be seen in novels by Jin Yong and Gu Long, films such as Crouching Tiger, Hidden Dragon, Shaolin Soccer and Kung Fu Hustle, as well as video games such as The Legend of Sword and Fairy and Xuan-Yuan Sword.

See also
 Dantian
 I Ching
 Qigong
 Silk reeling
 Daoyin
 Traditional Chinese medicine
 Wushu
 Wuxia
 Zhan zhuang
 Zhang Sanfeng

References

Further reading
Blofeld, J. Taoism, The Quest for Immortality, Mandala-Unwin Paperbacks London, 1989. 
Cheng, Tinhung. Tai Chi Transcendent Art, The Hong Kong Tai Chi Association Press Hong Kong, 1976. (only available in Chinese)
Hausen, J. and Tsaur, A. The Arts of Daoism, Purple Cloud Press, Auckland. 
Wile, Douglas Lost T'ai-chi Classics from the late Ch'ing Dynasty State University of New York Press, Albany, 1996. 
Wu Gongzao. Wu Family T'ai Chi Ch'uan, Hong Kong, 1980, Toronto 2006, 
Keen, Thomas.  Iron Vest Qigong. 
Danaos, Kosta, Nei Kung, The Secret Teachings of the Warrior Sage, Inner traditions, 2002, 
Chen Kaiguo and Zheng Shunchao, Opening the Dragon Gate. The Making of a Modern Taoist Wizard.. 
Miller, Dan and Cartmell, Tim "Xing Yi Nei Gong: Xing Yi Health Maintenance and Internal Strength Development", Unique Publications, North Hollywood, 1999.

External links
Neigong.net is a site devoted to original texts of neigong, neidan, neijia and qigong
Video of Nei Kung practitioner, John Chang
website for Xing Shen Zhuang practice as a foundation training
QigongJournal.com a website dedicated to all things Qigong and Neigong
(Wayback Machine copy)
Explanation of Nei Gong in the practice of standing postures (Zhan Zhuang)

Chinese martial arts terminology
Meditation
Qigong
Neijia
Taoist practices
Chinese philosophy